Norman Charles Fischer (born May 25, 1949) is an American cellist. He was born in Washington, D. C. Fischer is the Herbert S. Autrey Professor of Cello at the Shepherd School of Music at Rice University. He has also taught at the Oberlin Conservatory of Music and Dartmouth College.

Overview
A student of Richard Kapuscinski, Claus Adam and Bernard Greenhouse, Fischer is a graduate of the Oberlin Conservatory of Music. As cellist of the Concord String Quartet, he won a Naumburg Chamber Music Award, an Emmy Award, and two Grammy Award nominations. He is also the cellist of the Fischer Duo, a group with his wife, pianist Jeanne Kierman, which was selected as an Artistic Ambassador by the United States Information Agency.

Fischer has performed internationally as a chamber musician and soloist. The New York Times called his 1983 solo debut of Johann Sebastian Bach's complete cello suites "inspiring".

References 

American cellists
Musicians from Washington, D.C.
Living people
1949 births
Oberlin Conservatory of Music alumni
Rice University faculty
Dartmouth College faculty
Oberlin Conservatory of Music faculty